Haj House is a 19-storey building in Mumbai. It provides accommodation to the Haj bound Muslim people. A group named Sahyog Cultural Society gives training and hold orientation program for pilgrims in this house.

See also 
Haj House, Lucknow

References 

Hajj pilgrimage from India
Buildings and structures in Mumbai